Saudi Arabian airline Saudia flies to over 90 cities in Asia, Europe, Africa and North America from its hubs of Jeddah, Riyadh, Dammam, Medina and Abha.

Destinations

References

Saudia
Lists of airline destinations
Saudi Arabia transport-related lists
SkyTeam destinations